Much Afraid is the second studio album by American Christian rock band Jars of Clay. It was released in 1997 by Essential Records. Following the charting success of the band's debut album, Much Afraid was moderately successful, but was unable to achieve the level of its predecessor.

Background 

The title is a reference to Hannah Hurnard's 1955 novel Hinds' Feet on High Places, whose main character was named Much Afraid.

The album marked various musical and lyrical differences to its predecessor.

"Fade to Grey" and "Frail" were both previously from the group's demo recording Frail in 1994. All other tracks from that demo were recorded for the debut album Jars of Clay in 1995. Both songs were changed significantly, especially "Frail", which was previously an instrumental piece and now contained lyrics. Notably, these songs were two of the first songs written by Jars of Clay.

The album features the multi-instrumentalist Greg Wells, who went on to produce OneRepublic, Katy Perry, Pink, and Rufus Wainwright, playing drums and bass guitar on almost every song; he also co-wrote "Tea and Sympathy" and the single "Crazy Times".

The song "Five Candles (You Were There)" was originally written for the soundtrack to the Jim Carrey film Liar Liar, as the film is centred on a five-year old's birthday wish, but it was cut from the credits in favor of a blooper reel. The song was subsequently featured on a few other movie soundtracks. Like the movie Jack Frost.

One song recorded during the Much Afraid sessions that did not make the final track listing is "Fly Farther". The song, featuring vocals by Alison Krauss, was later released in 1999 on the band's early rarities collection The White Elephant Sessions.

Much Afraid earned the band a Grammy Award for Best Pop/Contemporary Gospel Album.

Track listing

Standard release 

All words and music by Jars of Clay, except where noted.

 "Overjoyed" (Words: Dan Haseltine / Music: Charlie Lowell, Stephen Mason, Matt Odmark, Greg Wells, Mark Hudson) – 2:58
 "Fade to Grey" (Jars of Clay, Matt Bronleewe) – 3:34
 "Tea and Sympathy" (Dan Haseltine, Greg Wells, Mark Hudson) – 4:51
 "Crazy Times" – 3:34
 "Frail" – 6:57
 "Five Candles (You Were There)" – 3:48
 "Weighed Down" – 3:39
 "Portrait of an Apology" – 5:43
 "Truce" – 3:11
 "Much Afraid" – 3:53
 "Hymn" – 3:53

Japanese track listing 

 "Overjoyed" – 2:58
 "Fade to Grey" – 3:34
 "Tea and Sympathy" – 4:51
 "Crazy Times" – 3:34
 "Frail" – 6:57
 "Five Candles (You Were There)" – 3:48
 "Weighed Down" – 3:39
 "Portrait of an Apology" – 5:43
 "Truce" – 3:11
 "Much Afraid" – 3:53
 "Hymn" – 3:53
 "The Chair" – 5:22 (from the soundtrack of The Long Kiss Goodnight)
 "Sleepers" – 1:54

Seatbelt Tuba track listing 

A bonus three-track disc was bundled with early copies of the album and made available exclusively through Family Christian Bookstores. All three tracks were recorded live acoustically on July 3, 1997 at the Quad, with no remastering or editing of the songs.

 "Crazy Times"
 "Liquid"
 "The Coffee Song"

Reception 

The album was highly anticipated due to the success and acclaim of the band's eponymous debut album, but was not as well received. Despite debuting at No. 8 on the Billboard 200 (the group's first record had failed to reach the Top 40), it quickly slid down the chart, its sales failing to match those of its predecessor. The lead single, "Crazy Times", did not perform well on mainstream radio. It was, however, better received on Christian radio.

Charts and certifications 

 Album

 Singles

Year-end charts

Personnel 
Jars of Clay
 Dan Haseltine – vocals, percussion
 Charlie Lowell – keyboards, acoustic piano, organ, backing vocals
 Stephen Mason – guitars, bass, backing vocals
 Matt Odmark – guitars, mandolin, backing vocals

Additional musicians

 Greg Wells – bass (1, 2, 3, 8), drums (1–5, 7–10), percussion (4)
 Neil Conti – drums (6)
 Kate St. John – English horn (5)
 Ronn Huff – string arrangements (2, 5, 8, 11)
 The Nashville String Machine – strings (2, 5, 8, 11)
 Richard Niles – string arrangements (3)
 Gavyn Wright – conductor (6)
 The London Session Orchestra – strings (6)

Production

 Stephen Lipson – producer
 Robert Beeson – executive producer, art direction
 Heff Moraes – engineer, mixing
 Chuck Linder – assistant engineer
 Mike Griffith – string engineer 
 Adam Hatley – assistant string engineer
 Don C. Tyler – digital editing
 Stephen Marcussen – mastering at Precision Mastering, Los Angeles, California
 Michelle Knapp – art direction
 Skye Communications – art direction, design, layout
 Photodisc – cover photography
 Martyn Galina-Jones – inside photography
 Norma Jean Roy – inside photography

References 

Jars of Clay albums
Essential Records (Christian) albums
1997 albums
Albums produced by Stephen Lipson
Grammy Award for Best Pop/Contemporary Gospel Album